Gold is a British pay television channel from the UKTV network that was launched in late 1992 as UK Gold before it was rebranded UKTV Gold in 2004. In 2008, it was split into current flagship channel Gold and miscellaneous channel, W, with classic comedy based programming now airing on Gold, non-crime drama and entertainment programming airing on W, and quiz shows and more high-brow comedy airing on Dave. It shows repeats of classic programming from the BBC, ITV and other broadcasters. Every December, from 2015 until 2018, the channel was temporarily renamed Christmas Gold. This has since been discontinued, although the channel still continues to broadcast Christmas comedy.

History

The channel was formed as a joint venture between the BBC, through commercial arm BBC Enterprises, American company Cox Enterprises and outgoing ITV London weekday franchisee Thames Television. The channel, named "UK Gold", was to show repeats of the 'classic' archive programming from the two broadcasters. The channel launched on 1 November 1992 at 7pm with Just Good Friends. The first commercial shown on the channel was for Lucozade, and all commercials shown in the first three breaks on the channel's launch night either had the word gold or golden in either the name of the brand advertised or mentioned in the commercial itself.

The rights to the BBC programmes previously were held by the BSB entertainment channel Galaxy, prior to the merger with Sky Television to form BSkyB in November 1990. The channel was initially broadcast on an analogue transponder from an SES satellite at 19.2°E which was less well suited for UK reception. As a result, the channel used to be notorious for being marred with interference, known as 'sparklies', in large parts of the UK. Another initial drawback was the cutting of programming down to fit commercial time slots, and the intensive use of commercial breaks. Reception improved however with the channel added to BSkyB's basic subscription package in 1993, and the launch of the channel on cable services.

In 1993, Flextech gained its first stake in the station after acquiring Tele-Communications' (TCI) TV interests in Europe. In 1996, it started discussions about increasing its stake, to gain full control. At that point, Flextech held 27% with Cox (38%), BBC (20%) and Pearson (15%). By the Autumn, Flextech held 80% of UK Gold. Flextech's main reason for increasing its stake in UK Gold was in participation of new talks with the BBC.

UKTV
The channel's success led to the launch of the UKTV network on 1 November 1997, owned by BBC Worldwide and Flextech, and consisting of three other channels: UK Arena, UK Horizons and UK Style, focusing on the arts, factual and lifestyle programmes respectively. The UKTV network would expand to include numerous more channels as the years progressed.

The UK Gold brand was expanded in October 1998 with the launch of the digital only channel UK Gold Classics, broadcasting some of the older comedy serials that were being lost from the UK Gold schedule, as the channel moved towards more modern programming. UK Gold Classics was not to last however, and was rebranded as UK Gold 2 on 2 April 1999, which acted as a time shift of the original channel, showing the daytime programmes from UK Gold in the evening on UK Gold 2. In 2003 however, UK Gold 2 was rebranded and repositioned as UK G2, with some programming transferring to the new channel.

On 8 March 2004, the channel was rebranded as "UKTV Gold" in line with the other channels in the UKTV network. At approximately the same time, Granada-run archive channel Granada Plus closed to make way for ITV3. The channels had always been the main rivals to Gold due to the direct mix of archive BBC and ITV programming. ITV3 currently has a higher viewer share, often put down to the fact that the terrestrial platform Freeview shows ITV3 but not Gold. In late 2004, to show films produced in Hollywood in a marathon, UKTV Gold temporarily changed its name to "USTV Gold". 

Gold began transmitting in widescreen on 31 January 2008, although some programmes made in 16:9 format were screened in the compromise 14:9 semi-letterboxed ratio for a short while, before the 16:9 format became standard later in the year. The channel has been criticised by some, particularly in recent years, for featuring many recent programmes as opposed to 'classics' as was the original concept, with some shows appearing on the channel mere months or weeks after their first television broadcast.

2008 rebrand

In 2008, UKTV began a process of rebranding and expanding its channels, removing "UKTV" from their name, following the rebranding of UKTV G2 as Dave in October 2007. On 7 October 2008, UKTV Gold became "G.O.L.D.", exclusively showing comedy, both old and new. This is reflected by its new slogan, which now represents Gold as a backronym—"Go On Laugh Daily". Unlike the complete name change for Dave, the Gold name was retained as having a resonance with viewers. The same day also saw the rebranding of UKTV Drama as Alibi, and the launch of a new channel, Watch. In Spring 2010, the channel dropped the acronym and is now known simply as "Gold".

In October 2011, Virgin Media, owner of half of Gold and the rest of the UKTV network, sold their share to Scripps Networks Interactive, with the remaining half still retained by the BBC's commercial arm, BBC Worldwide.

2012 programming investment
In February 2012, it was announced that UKTV was to invest millions into producing its own original shows. According to the trade magazine, Broadcast, Gold "has secured a budget running into "double-digit millions" to create a raft of new comedy shows over the next two years". The article went on to say "the channel is looking to develop a mix of panel shows, sketch shows, sitcoms and comedy dramas". This move meant that Gold would follow its sister, Dave, which has resurrected Red Dwarf and produced numerous different panel and entertainment series, and BSkyB, who have invested £600m into original comedy for Sky One and Sky Atlantic. The first set of new series for Gold were broadcast in the latter half of 2012.

UKTV executive Jane Rogers stated to Broadcast that the commissions would be high-quality, as "they would need to sit confidently alongside classics such as Only Fools And Horses and The Vicar of Dibley". She also added: "Gold is well entrenched in the UK's psyche as the home of national treasure comedies, so we cannot afford to look cheap next to those programmes. It's important that anything we order continues that love and feel, but we don't want to look back; we want a contemporary stamp on the channel." Commissioning editor Sarah Fraser commented that "there's never been a better time to invest in homegrown comedy. Comedians are selling out arena tours, being cast in the West End and on the big screen here and in the US."

The first programme announced as part of the investment was a reboot of the BBC sitcom, Yes, Prime Minister, to be based on the 2010 stage production and written by original writers Sir Antony Jay and Jonathan Lynn. The reboot was the second classic BBC sitcom to be resurrected by a UKTV network, following the two Dave-commissioned series of Red Dwarf. News about other new commissions for the channel were announced during the summer.

Freeview
The channel was removed from Freeview in 2013, along with Home as part of the closure of Top Up TV and was replaced with Drama in July 2013. However, Home relaunched on the platform in March 2016. Gold and Home were not available to watch on Freeview boxes and televisions due to them being encrypted as subscription channels on Top Up TV.

Subsidiary channels

Gold +1
Alongside the main channel, a time shift channel is also operated: Gold +1. Corresponding to the name on the main channel, shows all programming from the channel one hour later.

The channel was originally announced by UKTV on 30 June 2002, under the name of UK Gold +1, later launching on Sky on 1 August 2002. As with its then-sister UK Gold 2, it only initially broadcast in the evening, at 7pm-7am. By 12 November 2003, the channel gained a full 24-hour slot, and later went under the names of UKTV Gold +1 and G.O.L.D. +1 before gaining its current name in 2010.

UK Gold Classics/UK Gold 2

UK Gold Classics originally launched on 2 October 1998 to coincide with the launch of Sky Digital. It was UKTV's first digital-exclusive network. The channel initially focused on older programs while the main UK Gold began focusing more on newer programmes. The channel also only broadcast within the evening, airing from 6.00 pm to 2.00 am every day.

UK Gold Classics only lasted six months, with the channel closing on 28 March 1999, and from 2 April 1999, the channel was relaunched as UK Gold 2, becoming a secondary timeshift service that broadcast UK Gold's daytime schedule in the evening.

On 29 October 2003, UKTV announced that UK Gold 2 would be relaunched as UK G2 on 12 November, being reinvented as a younger-oriented edgier youth network aimed towards a 16-34-year-old demographic.

Gold HD
A HD version of Gold was launched on 2 October 2017 exclusively to Sky, replacing Eden HD on the platform. Gold HD was added to Virgin Media on 25 September 2018, replacing Gold in standard definition. It was added to BT TV on 11 March 2019, along with Vice HD.

On-air identity

For the first few years, idents on UK Gold featured an animated golden retriever mascot named "Goldie" posing with the UK Gold logo. Goldie was never name-checked as such on air, possibly owing to the death of the Blue Peter dog Goldie some weeks before launch, although the late-night music video slot Dog House was originally listed as Goldie's Video Bites in initial pre-launch listings. The Goldie idents were kept until 1993, when they were replaced with a form-up of the first logo against a blue background. A re-branding in 1994 saw UK Gold adopt idents based on the forging of gold bars, with the station's logo appearing to have been stamped into gold. Variations on this theme were used until 1997, when the channel received a revamp as part of the formation of the UKTV network.

The new network's corporate identity saw all its channels logos simplified to a boxed "UK" followed by the name (e.g. "Gold") in the Gill Sans font, which had also been adopted by the BBC. The new network-wide ident theme would involve the splitting of the screen for different purposes. UK Gold's new idents depicted objects such as apples or leaves falling through the top half of the screen, with only the gold coloured ones reaching the bottom half of the screen. These idents were briefly adopted for UK Gold 2 when it launched in 1998.

The theme changed again, this time with idents featuring fireworks making shapes in the air, was launched in April 1999. The fireworks theme was carried on in a new set of idents, alongside another network-wide re-branding of the logo in 2002, adopting a bolder font and merging UK into a single composite character. A range of live-action idents showing everyday activities from unusual perspectives appeared in 2002. The 2003 to 2007 idents showed channel hopping viewers with their TV set "off stage" being brought to a halt by the appearance of a golden light accompanied by the channel's ident jingle. This new identity also featured a series of shifting yellow, orange and red blocks which suggested a gold bar at the centre of the screen.

On 4 April 2007, UKTV Gold unveiled a new on-air identity centred around a branded golden space hopper, playing to contemporary trends toward 1970s nostalgia, and emphasising the station's re-run content. Twelve new live action idents featured the branded space hopper, either with people on them bouncing around normally serious scenes, or let loose to bounce around the natural environment, aired from 5 April 2007 to 7 October 2008.

On 7 October 2008, following the rebranding, Gold's 2008 presentation debuted, featuring cartoon objects making a giant chain, in Heath Robinson fashion, which triggers an event to herald the next programme. The Gold logo features in the centre, with the channel slogan usually appearing alongside in the sequence. Programmes are announced by sole channel continuity announcer David Flynn, who has had the position since June 2009.

In 2012, the logo was changed slightly, with an updated ident package. These followed a similar style to the previous set, but instead of the previous backronym, the idents focussed on the slogan of ‘Stick Something Funny On’.

In July 2014, Gold rebranded after two years in its second identity. The logo is a ribbon with the letters "GOLD". The new idents have funny and wacky stuff happening (such as dancing legs). At the end of the idents, the ribbon comes out saying "GOLD", while the activity behind it is still going.

Programming
The output of the channel is mainly British comedy programmes including repeats of BBC shows and sometimes feature-length films. The following is a list of all the programmes that have been shown over the years, plus ones that are currently being shown:

Current

 2point4 Children
 Absolutely Fabulous
 All Round to Mrs. Brown's
 Are You Being Served?
 As Time Goes By
 Blackadder 
 Bottom
 Chef!
 Citizen Khan
 Dad's Army
 Desmond's
 dinnerladies
 Ever Decreasing Circles
 The Fast Show
 Fawlty Towers
 French and Saunders
 Game On
 Gavin & Stacey
 Ghosts
 The Good Life
 The Green Green Grass
 Harry Enfield and Chums
 Hi-de-Hi!
 Hold the Sunset
 I'm Alan Partridge
 Inside No. 9
 Keeping Up Appearances
 Knowing Me Knowing You with Alan Partridge
 Last of the Summer Wine
 Live at the Apollo
 Men Behaving Badly (1997-present)
 Michael McIntyre's Comedy Roadshow (September 16, 2016-2020)
 Morgana Robinson's The Agency (2018-April 2020)
 Mrs. Brown's Boys (July 24, 2013-present)
 My Hero (September 8, 2003-present)
 Not Going Out (2013-present)
 The Office (October 21, 2002-2007; 2010-2011; 2013-September 2022)
 Only Fools and Horses (1992-present)
 Open All Hours (1992-present)
 Peep Show (2015-present)
 Porridge (1992-present)
 Rock & Chips (March 7, 2011-2021)
 Roger & Val Have Just Got In (August 22, 2011-2022)
 The Royle Family (February 27, 2000-present)
 Still Open All Hours (2015-2022)
 This Time with Alan Partridge (October  2020-present)
 Two Doors Down (2019-2022)
 Upstart Crow (2018-present)
 The Vicar of Dibley (August 27, 1999-present)
 Wallace & Gromit (1998-2022)
 You Rang, M'Lord? (1994-2021)
 The Young Ones (1992-present)

Currently made for GOLD (UKTV Originals)

 5 Minute Mayhem 
 30 Years of The Comic Strip Presents 
 Billy Connolly Does...
 Blackadder Exclusive: The Whole Rotten Saga 
 Blackadder's Most Cunning Moments
 Bob Monkhouse: The Million Joke Man 
 Bring Me Morecambe & Wise 
 Britain's Greatest Comedian 
 Britain's Greatest Comedy Character 
 Bull 
 The Cockfields 
 Dad's Army: The Lost Episodes 
 David Jason: My Life On Screen 
 David Jason: Planes, Trains and Automobiles 
 dinnerladies diaries 
 Do Not Disturb 
 The Fast Show: Just A Load Of Blooming Catchphrases
 The Fast Show: More Blooming Catchphrases
 Fawlty Towers: Re-Opened 
 Fawlty Towers: Basil's Best Bits 
 French And Saunders: Funny Women
 Fry And Laurie Reunited 
 Hancock: Very Nearly An Armful
 Henry IX 
 How The Young Ones Changed Comedy 
 The Interviews 
 Jo Brand's Great Wall of Comedy 
 Legends of Stand-up And Bernard Righton 
 Lenny Henry's Race Through Comedy 
 Marley's Ghosts 
 Monty Python's Best Bits (Mostly) 
 Monty Python Live (Mostly) 
 Monty Python's The Meaning of Live 
 Morecambe and Wise in America 
 Murder on the Blackpool Express 
 My Favourite Sketch 
 Newark, Newark
 Porridge: Inside Out 
 The Rebel 
 Ricky and Ralf's Very Northern Road Trip 
 Richard E. Grant on Ealing Comedies 
 Royle Exclusive: Behind The Sofa 
 The Royle Family Portraits 
 Saluting Dad's Army 
 Sandylands
 Sitcom Does... 
 Smashie's Christmastastic Playlist 
 The Story of...Only Fools and Horses 
 Telly Addict 
 Trust Morecambe and Wise 
 The Two Ronnies Spectacle 
 The Vicar Of Dibley: Inside Out
 The Vicar of Dibley's 40 Greatest Moments 
 We Have Been Watching 
 When Were We Funniest? 
 Yes, Prime Minister: Re-Elected 
 You, Me & Them 
 The Young Ones 20 Greatest Moments

Previous
Programming of classic general entertainment and movies now unused or superseded on 7 October 2008. Some programmes that were shown on UKTV G2 moved to other channels sometime later when it was renamed Dave in October 2007. However, most of the classic comedy series includes re-runs of some BBC shows which are used only on this channel. Some of its classic general entertainment shows moved to other current UKTV channels such as Dave, Watch, and Alibi.

 The 10th Kingdom
 15 Storeys High
 100 Years of Horror
 The A-Team 
 According to Jim
 The Adventures of Jeffrey
 After Henry 
 After The Show
 After You've Gone
 The Afternoon Play
 Agatha Christie's Poirot 
 Aim Low: The Best of Dylan Moran
 Airport
 Alas Smith and Jones
 Alan Davies: As Yet Untitled 
 Alexei Sayle's Stuff
 Alistair McGowan's Big Impression
 All About Me
 All Creatures Great and Small 
 All Gas and Gaiters
 'Allo 'Allo! 
 ...And Mother Makes Three
 ...And Mother Makes Five
 Anne of Avonlea
 Angels
 Animal Capers
 Animal Park
 Anyone for Pennis (1997-98; September 2002; 2005)
 The Armando Iannucci Shows 
 Ask the Family (1999-2000; 2004)
 Auf Wiedersehen, Pet (1997-2005; 2006-2016)
 Backup (1997-2003)
 Ballet Shoes (1993-2006)
 Ballykissangel (1999-2007)
 Bangkok Hilton (1994-2000)
 Baywatch (1993-2008)
 Beast (27 April 2001-2007)
 Beggar My Neighbour (1992-1997)
 Bellamy's People (14 February 2015-2018)
 Ben Elton: The Man from Auntie (1997-2002)
 The Ben Elton Show (2000-2003)
 Bergerac (1992-2005)
 The Best of Tommy Cooper 
 The Best of Top of the Pops 
 Between the Lines (1995-December 2004)
 Beverly Hills Teens (1993-1998)
 Bewitched (25 June 2012-2018)
 Big Break (1997-2004)
 Big Deal (1992-1997)
 Big School (2016-2017)
 Big Train (7 October 2013-2018)
 Billionaire Boy (2017-2018)
 The Bill (1992-2008)
 Bill Hicks Live: Relentless (2016-March 2017)
 Bill Hicks: It's Just a Ride (2018)
 Bill Hicks: One Night Stand (1998-September 2004)
 Bill Hicks: Revelations (2016-2019)
 Bill Hicks: Sane Man 
 Birds of a Feather (
 A Bit of a Do 
 A Bit of Fry & Laurie Black Books 
 Blake's 7 
 Blandings Blankety Blank 
 The Bleak Old Shop of Stuff Bless This House 
 Blott on the Landscape Blue Peter (Early Classics)
 The Blue Planet 
 The Bob Monkhouse Show Bob Monkhouse: On The Spot 
 Bob's Full House Boomers Boon Bottom Live Bottom Live: The Big Number Two Tour Bottom Live 3: Hooligan's Island Bottom Live 2001: An Arse Oddity Bottom Live 2003: Weapons Grade Y-Fronts Tour The Boy in the Dress 
 Boys from the Blackstuff Bravestarr Bread 
 Bridget & Eamon The Brittas Empire 
 The Brothers 
 Brush Strokes 
 Bugs Bullseye 
 Butterflies 
 Button Moon Callan Campion Canned Carrott Capital City Captain Pugwash Captain Scarlet and the Mysterons Carrie's War (1974 version)
 Carrott Confidential Carrott's Lib Carry on Laughing Casualty 
 The Catherine Tate Show 
 Catherine Tate's Nan Celebrity Masterchef 
 Chambers Chancer The Changes Charlie's Angels 
 Chelmsford 123 
 Cheers 
 The Chief Chigley The Chinese Detective Chocky Chorlton and the Wheelies The Chronicles of Narnia Citizen Smith 
 Clarence Clocking Off 
 Coast 
 The Colbys Colditz Colin's Sandwich Comedy Connections The Comedy Genius of John Sullivan Come Fly with Me The Comic Strip Presents Commercial Breakdown Comic Roots Common as Muck Coogan's Run Cool It Count Duckula Coupling Cowboys Cracker 
 Crapston Villas Creature Comforts Crime Traveller Crossroads Dallas 
 Dalziel and Pascoe 
 Dancing with the Stars Danger Mouse Danger UXB Dangerfield 
 The Darling Buds of May 
 Dave's One Night Stand David Copperfield 
 The Day of the Triffids Dear John 
 Defenders of the Earth Degrassi Junior High The Detectives The Dick Emery Show The District Nurse DIY SOS 
 Dr. Terrible's House of Horrible Doctor Who (Classic Series) 
 Doctors (Early Classics)
 Doomwatch Don't Wait Up Down to Earth Driving School The Duchess of Duke Street 
 Due South 
 Dungeons and Dragons Duty Free 
 Dynasty 
 Dylan Moran Live - What It Is Dylan Moran - Yeah Yeah Yeah Live Early Doors EastEnders (Early Classics) 
 Eddie Izzard: Force Majeure - Live Edge of Darkness Eldorado Elizabeth R The Equalizer Euromillions: Boom! Bang a Bang! Executive Stress 
 Every Second Counts Extras Extreme Makeover: Home Edition Fairly Secret Army The Fall and Rise of Reginald Perrin 
 Family Affairs Family Fortunes 
 Fantasy Island Father, Dear Father 
 Filthy, Rich and Catflap The Firm (1989 film)
 First Born First of the Summer Wine The Flame Trees of Thika Flash Gordon The Flying Doctors For the Love of Ada The Fosters The Fourth Arm Frank Stubbs Promotes Frankie Howerd: The Lost Tapes 
 French Fields 
 Fresh Fields 
 Friday Night with Jonathan Ross Full House 
 Galaxy Rangers Gangsters Garth Marenghi's Darkplace 
 The Generation Game The Generation Game: Then Again 
 George and Mildred 
 Get Some In! 
 Getting On Give Us a Clue Going for Gold 
 Going Straight Gold Goes Pop 
 The Good Old Days The Goodies Goodness Gracious Me Goodnight Sweetheart 
 Grace and Favour Grange Hill (Early Classics)
 The Greatest Christmas Comedy Moments 
 Green Wing 
 Hamish Macbeth 
 Hancock's Half Hour Hannay Happy Days Happy Ever After Happy Families Harbour Lights Harry & Paul Harry Hill's TV Burp Hattie 
 Have I Got News for You (Early Classics)
 Hazell Heartbeat 
 Hearts and Bones Hebburn The Hello Girls Heroes of Comedy Hetty Wainthropp Investigates 
 Hippies The Hitchhiker's Guide to the Galaxy Holby City (Early Classics) 
 Holocaust Holy Flying Circus Home to Roost 
 Hope and Glory 
 A Horseman Riding By Hotel The House of Eliott 
 House of Fools Howards' Way 
 Human Remains I, Claudius I Dream of Jeannie 
 The Imaginatively Titled Punt & Dennis Show The Incredible Adventures of Professor Branestawm In Concert In Justice In Loving Memory In Sickness and in Health In the Line of Duty: The F.B.I. Murders The Innes Book of Records Inspector Morse 
 Ironside 
 It Ain't Half Hot Mum It Wouldn't be Christmas Without...Top 10 
 It's a Knockout It's Ulrika! 
 Ivanhoe Jack Dee's Happy Hour 
 Jack the Ripper 
 Jam Jam & Jerusalem 
 Jamie & the Magic Torch The Jasper Carrott Trial Jeeves and Wooster 
 Jim'll Fix It Strikes Again 
 Joe 90 John Bishop's Christmas Show Jonathan Creek 
 Josh 
 Juliet Bravo 
 Just a Minute Just Good Friends 
 Keeping Mum 
 Keep It in the Family 
 Ken Dodd's World of Laughter The Kenny Everett Television Show The Kenny Everett Video Show A Kick Up the Eighties Kinsey Kiss Me Kate The Kit Curran Radio Show Knots Landing Kojak 
 The Kumars at No. 42 
 KYTV Lassie Laurel and Hardy Lazarus & Dingwall The League of Gentlemen Legacy of Murder The Lenny Henry Show Let Them Eat Cake A Life of Grime The Life of Rock with Brian Pern Life Support Life Without George Life's Too Short Lifestyles of the Rich and Famous The Likely Lads Like It or Lump It Like, Totally... Dylan Moran Live Limmy's Show Linda Green The Little and Large Show Little Britain Little Britain USA Live at Jongleurs The Liver Birds 
 Lizzie and Sarah Lois & Clark: The New Adventures of Superman London's Burning 
 The Lotus Eaters Lovejoy 
 Love Thy Neighbour Lucky Feller Lytton's Diary MacKenzie Mad About Alice Made in Britain The Magnificent Evans Magnum, P.I. 
 Maid Marian and Her Merry Men Maisie Raine 
 Man About the House 
 A Many Splintered Thing Marion and Geoff The Mary Whitehouse Experience Mastermind (Early Classics)
 Match of the Day (Early Classics)
 May to December 
 Meantime The Men's Room Merseybeat Miami Vice 
 Middlemarch Minder 
 Miranda 
 Miss Marple 
 The Missing Postman The Mistress Monarch of the Glen 
 Monty Python's Flying Circus 
 Monty Python: Before The Flying Circus 
 Monty Python Live at Aspen 
 Monty Python Live at the Hollywood Bowl 
 Moon and Son The Morecambe & Wise Show Morecambe and Wise: The Greatest Moment 
 The Morph Files Mother Love Murder Most Horrid 
 Murder, She Wrote 
 The Mrs Bradley Mysteries 
 My Family 
 My Family and Other Animals Naked Video Nanny Nathan Barley 
 Neighbours (Early Classics)
 Never Mind the Quality, Feel the Width Never the Twain 
 The New Adventures of Old Christine 
 The New Avengers 
 The New Statesman 
 New Tricks 
 Newman and Baddiel in Pieces Nice Work Nighty Night No Place Like Home 
 Not the Nine O'Clock News Nurse NYPD Blue Odd Man Out 
 Odd One Out Office Gossip Oh, Brother! Oh, Doctor Beeching! The Old Guys Oliver Twist The Omid Djalili Show One by One One Foot in the Grave 
 The One Ronnie The Onedin Line 
 Only Fools and Horses Greatest Moments 
 Only When I Laugh 
 On the Buses 
 Operation Good Guys Oppenheimer Outnumbered 
 OWL/TV The Pallisers The Paradise Club Parkinson Parrot Sketch Not Included – 20 Years of Monty Python Paul Daniels' Quick Trick 
 Pauline Calf's Wedding Video Peak Practice 
 Perry Mason Penmarric Pib and Pog Pie in the Sky 
 The Piglet Files The Pink Panther Show Planet Earth 
 Playing the Field Please Sir! 
 Poldark Police Squad! Popeye Porterhouse Blue Pramface Pride and Prejudice 
 Prime Suspect Prison Break Prisoner Private Schulz The Professionals 
 Professor Branestawm Returns Psychoville Pulling QI 
 Quantum Leap 
 A Question of Sport Rab C. Nesbitt Rainbow 
 The Real McCoy Real Women Record Breakers Red Dwarf 
 Rentaghost Rev. Rex the Runt Rhoda Riders Rings on Their Fingers Ripping Yarns 
 Rising Damp 
 Rob Brydon: Live Robbie the Reindeer Robin Hood Robin of Sherwood 
 Robin's Nest 
 Rock Goes to College Rock Profile The Rockford Files Rockliffe 
 Room 101 (series 1–3)
 The Rory Bremner Show Rosie Rowan Atkinson Live Rowland Rivron Bites The Bullet 
 Ruby Wax Meets... Rude Dog and the Dweebs Rumpole of the Bailey 
 The Russ Abbot Show Rutland Weekend Television Sapphire & Steel Saxondale The Scold's Bridle 
 Scotch and Wry Screen One The Sculptress 
 Seaside Rescue Secret Army The Secret Diary of Adrian Mole The Secret Garden Selwyn A Sense of Guilt Seven of One Shadows of the Heart Shark Sharon and Elsie Sharpe 
 A Sharp Intake of Breath Shelley 
 Shoestring Shooting Stars Shut That Door! Silent Witness 
 The Sitcom Showdown 
 The Six Wives of Henry VIII Sleepers Slinger's Day 
 Smack the Pony 
 The Smell of Reeves and Mortimer Snuff Box So What Now? Soldier Soldier 
 Solo Some Mothers Do 'Ave 'Em 
 Sons and Daughters Sorry! 
 South of the Border Spaced 
 Spender Spitting Image Sports Anorak of the Year 
 Stag Stand Up With Alan Davies Stargate SG-1 Stark Stars in Their Eyes 
 Starstruck Classics 
 Stay Lucky Stella Street Steptoe and Son 
 Steve Coogan: The Inside Story Steve Coogan Live 'N' Lewd Steve Coogan – The Man Who Thinks He's it! Steve Coogan as Alan Partridge and Other Less Successful Characters – Live! Stewart Lee's Comedy Vehicle Stingray The Story of Dibley The Sullivans Survivors The Sweeney 
 Sykes 
 Taggart 
 Take a Letter, Mr. Jones Tales of the Unexpected  
 Tears Before Bedtime Tenko 
 Telford's Change Tellystack 
 Terry and June 
 That Mitchell and Webb Look That's Showbusiness Then Churchill Said to Me 
 The Thick of It Thin Air The Thin Blue Line This Life The Thoughts of Chairman Alf Thunderbirds Three of a Kind Three Up, Two Down Till Death Us Do Part Time Trumpet The Tommy Cooper Hour 
 The Tony Ferrino Phenomenon 
 To Serve Them All My Days To the Manor Born 
 Traffic Cops 
 Triangle A Tribute To Bruce Forsyth The Tripods 
 The Trip Tripper's Day 
 TV: Now and Then 
 Two Pints of Lager and a Packet of Crisps The Two Ronnies 
 The Two Ronnies Sketchbook 
 The Upchat Line 
 Van der Valk Vanity Fair 
 A Very Peculiar Practice Vic Reeves Big Night Out Victoria Wood: As Seen on TV Victoria Wood Presents... Victoria Wood with All the Trimmings Victoria Wood's Mid Life Christmas Visionaries: Knights of the Magical Light Waiting for God 
 Waking the Dead 
 Walking with Dinosaurs Walliams & Friend Waterloo Road 
 The Weakest Link 
 We Love the Royle Family 
 We're Doomed! The Dad's Army Story Whatever Happened to the Likely Lads? 
 When the Boat Comes In 
 Where the Heart Is 
 Who Do You Think You Are? Whoops Baghdad Wild West Wogan: Now and Then 
 A Woman of Substance A Word with Alf 
 The Worst Week of My Life 
 Worzel Gummidge The Wrong Mans 
 Wuthering Heights Yes Minister 
 You Bet! You're Only Young Twice''

Other ventures
An analogue teletext service known as GoldText used to be available on the channel, but has since closed down.

See also
 UKTV
 Television in the United Kingdom
 BBC Worldwide

References

External links
 

Television channels and stations established in 1992
1992 establishments in the United Kingdom
UKTV channels
Classic television networks
Comedy television networks